MIT School of Telecom Management, Pune is a higher education institution in Pune, India. The school, established in 2007, is one of   MAEER's MIT Group of Institutions. It was established to build quality manpower with technical managerial skills. It is supported by industry in designing the academic curriculum.

Programs
 Post Graduate Diploma in Management, with Specialization in Telecom Systems, Marketing and Finance.
Affiliation : AICTE
 Master of Business Administration, with Specialization in Telecom Systems, Marketing and Finance.
Affiliation : Mahatma Gandhi University
 Master of  Science in International Business  
Affiliation:  of Dundee, UK,       * University of Abertay Dundee, UK, and  Robert Gordon University, UK

Ranking
It has been ranked A in business India Survey 2013. It has recent ranked A4 in India Management survey 2014

References

Universities and colleges in Pune